The 1977 Men's World Team Amateur Squash Championships were held in Toronto and Ottawa in Canada and took place from September 12 to September 18, 1977.

Results

Round Robin

See also 
World Team Squash Championships
World Squash Federation
World Open (squash)

References 

World Squash Championships
Squash tournaments in Canada
International sports competitions hosted by Canada
Squash
Mens